Ruczaj  is a settlement in the administrative district of Gmina Ruciane-Nida, within Pisz County, Warmian-Masurian Voivodeship, in northern Poland.

References

Ruczaj